Moulvibazar-2 is a constituency represented in the Jatiya Sangsad (National Parliament) of Bangladesh since 2019 by Sultan Md. Mansur Ahmed of the Gano Forum.

Boundaries 
The constituency encompasses Kulaura Upazila.

History 
The constituency was created in 1984 from a Sylhet constituency when the former Sylhet District was split into four districts: Sunamganj, Sylhet, Moulvibazar, and Habiganj.

Ahead of the 2008 general election, the Election Commission redrew constituency boundaries to reflect population changes revealed by the 2001 Bangladesh census. The 2008 redistricting altered the boundaries of the constituency.

Ahead of the 2018 general election, the Election Commission reduced the boundaries of the constituency by removing four union parishads of Kamalganj Upazila: Adampur, Alinagar, Islampur, and Shamshernagar.

Members of Parliament

Elections

Elections in the 2010s

Elections in the 2000s

Elections in the 1990s

References

External links
 

Parliamentary constituencies in Bangladesh
Moulvibazar District
Kulaura Upazila